Muhammad Akhlaq (born 12 November 1992) is a Pakistani cricketer. He made his first-class debut for Lahore Lions in the 2014–15 Quaid-e-Azam Trophy on 30 November 2014. In January 2021, he was named in Central Punjab's squad for the 2020–21 Pakistan Cup. In December 2021, he was signed by Islamabad United following the players' draft for the 2022 Pakistan Super League.

References

External links
 

1992 births
Living people
Pakistani cricketers
Central Punjab cricketers
Lahore Blues cricketers
Lahore Lions cricketers
Islamabad United cricketers
Cricketers from Gujranwala